Balys Sruoga (February 2, 1896 – October 16, 1947) was a Lithuanian poet, playwright, critic, and literary theorist.

Early life
He contributed to cultural journals from his early youth. His works were published by the liberal wing of the Lithuanian cultural movement, and also in various Lithuanian newspapers and other outlets (such as Aušrinė, Rygos naujienos etc.). In 1914, he began studying literature in Saint Petersburg, and later in Moscow, due to World War I and the Russian Revolution. In 1921, he enrolled in the Ludwig Maximilian University of Munich, where in 1924 he received his Ph.D for a doctoral thesis on Lithuanian folklore.

After returning to Lithuania, Sruoga taught at the University of Lithuania, and established a theater seminar that eventually became a course of study. He also wrote various articles on literature. From 1930 he began writing dramas, first Milžino paunksmė, later Radvila Perkūnas, Baisioji naktis and Aitvaras teisėjas. In 1939, he began teaching at Vilnius University. After the Soviet annexation of Lithuania, Sruoga wrot a pro Soviet cantata welcoming the new Soviet government.

Nazi captivity

The forest of the Gods
Sruoga's best known work is the novel Forest of the Gods, based on his own life experiences as a prisoner in Stutthof concentration camp in Sztutowo, Free City of Danzig now present-day Nowy Dwór Gdański County, Pomeranian Voivodeship, Poland, where he was sent in March 1943 together with forty-seven other Lithuanian intellectuals after the Nazis started a campaign against possible anti-Nazi agitation in occupied Lithuania.

In the book, Sruoga revealed life in a concentration camp through the eyes of a man whose only way to save his life and maintain his dignity was to view everything through a veil of irony and humor, where torturers and their victims are exposed as imperfect human beings, being far removed from the false ideals of their political leaders. For example, he wrote "A man is not a machine. He gets tired.", referring to the guards beating prisoners.

Originally the novel was suppressed by the Soviet officials; it was ultimately published in 1957, ten years after the author's death.

In 2005, a movie with the same titled as the book was released. The film Forest of the Gods became the most profitable film released after Lithuania restored its independence.

Later life
After the Soviets liberated the Nazi camps, Sruoga continued to be held in the same camp. However, in 1945, he returned to Vilnius and continued teaching at Vilnius University, where he wrote the dramas Pajūrio kurortas and Barbora Radvilaitė.

The authorities' refusal to publish Forest of The Gods and weak health resulting from his time in concentration camps led to his death in October 16, 1947 (he died going back from Kaunas to Vilnius because of a cold). The 2005 film Forest of the Gods was based on the book.

References

External links
 Bibliography

1896 births
1947 deaths
20th-century dramatists and playwrights
20th-century poets
Lithuanian dramatists and playwrights
Lithuanian folklorists
Lithuanian male poets
Ludwig Maximilian University of Munich alumni
Moscow State University alumni
People from Biržai District Municipality
People from Kovno Governorate
Saint Petersburg State University alumni
Stutthof concentration camp survivors
Academic staff of Vilnius University
Academic staff of Vytautas Magnus University
Burials at Rasos Cemetery